Butabul  is an airstrip serving Ramlat Bu Tubul in Oman. The isolated airport is in the desert,  from the border with Saudi Arabia.

See also
Transport in Oman
List of airports in Oman

References

External links
 OpenStreetMap - Butabul Airport

Airports in Oman